Howlin Rain is the eponymous debut album by Howlin Rain. It was released in 2006 on the Birdman Records label.

Track listing
 "Death Prayer in Heaven's Orchard" – 4:03
 "Calling Lightning with a Scythe" – 6:15
 "Roll on the Rusted Days" – 5:51
 "The Hanging Heart" – 9:11
 "Show Business" – 3:10
 "Indians, Whores and Spanish Men of God" – 6:27
 "In Sand and Dirt" – 5:53
 "The Firing of the Midnight Rain" – 9:46

Personnel
 Ethan Miller – Vocals, guitar
 Ian Gradek – Bass
 John Moloney – Drums

2006 debut albums
Birdman Records albums
Howlin Rain albums